Maldivian Sri Lankan refer to people of Dhivehi ethnicity living in Sri Lanka, there are approximately 20,000 of them, as of 2013.

History
Sinhalese people, as well as Bengali people and Oriya people have connections to Mahl people due to long-lasting contact through trade and travel. Local oral tradition says that when Mahls went to the Maldivies the Tivarun who first settled in the islands have migrated to Sri Lanka.

See also
 Sri Lankan Maldivian
 Maldives–Sri Lanka relations

References

Sri Lanka
Sri Lanka
Asian diaspora in Sri Lanka
Maldives–Sri Lanka relations